Christofer Robín Jurado López (born 27 October 1995) is a Panamanian cyclist, who currently rides for UCI Continental team .

Major results

2017
 National Road Championships
1st  Road race
1st  Under-23 road race
2nd Under-23 time trial
3rd Time trial
2018
 National Road Championships
1st  Road race
5th Time trial
 1st  Mountains classification Tour of China II
 Central American and Caribbean Games
2nd  Road race
6th Time trial
2019 
 National Road Championships
1st  Time trial
2nd Road race
 1st Stage 5 Vuelta Independencia Nacional
 Central American Road Championships
2nd Time trial
9th Road race
 Pan American Games
4th Road race
5th Time trial
 6th Overall Tour of Quanzhou Bay
 8th Road race, Pan American Road Championships
2020
 1st  Time trial, Central American Road Championships 
 National Road Championships
1st  Road race
1st  Time trial
 Vuelta a Guatemala
1st Stages 4 (ITT) & 10
2021
 National Road Championships
 1st  Time trial
 2nd Road Race
 Central American Road Championships 
 1st  Road race
 2nd  Time trial
 1st Germenica Grand Prix Road Race
2022
 3rd  Time trial, Bolivarian Games
 7th Overall Vuelta a Formosa Internacional
 8th Grand Prix Velo Alanya

References

External links

Panamanian male cyclists
1995 births
Living people
Sportspeople from Panama City
Pan American Games competitors for Panama
Cyclists at the 2019 Pan American Games
Olympic cyclists of Panama
Cyclists at the 2020 Summer Olympics
21st-century Panamanian people
Competitors at the 2018 Central American and Caribbean Games